is a seventh studio album by a Japanese singer-songwriter Miyuki Nakajima, released in April 1980.

Track listing
All songs written and composed by Miyuki Nakajima, except an untitled interlude composed by Tsugutoshi Goto.

Side one
All songs arranged by Tsugutoshi Goto, except "Sobaya" co-arranged by Miyuki Nakajima
""  – 7:27
""  – 4:54
""  – 4:08
""  – 5:09

Side two
All songs arranged by Tsugutoshi Goto, except "Ikoku" co-arranged by Miyuki Nakajima
"" – 5:12
Untitled – 1:10
""  – 7:44
""  – 9:12

Personnel
Miyuki Nakajima - vocals, acoustic guitar
Takahiko Ishikawa - acoustic guitar, flat mandolin
Shigeru Suzuki - electric guitar
Tsugutoshi Goto - electric bass
Makiko Tashiro - keyboards
Akira Nishimoto - keyboards
Fumihiko Kazama - accordion
Nobuo Yagi - harmonica
Shin Kazuhara - piccolo trumpet
Yukio Eto - flute, alto flute, bass flute
Minoru Muraoka - shakuhachi
Rien Takimoto - drums
Hiro Tsunoda - drums
Yas-Kaz Sato - Latin percussions
Yoshihisa Tamano - violin
Joe Ensemble - strings

Chart positions

Release history

References

1980 albums
Miyuki Nakajima albums
Pony Canyon albums